Laura Fiora Rodríguez Riccomini (April 1, 1957 – July 18, 1992) was a Chilean political activist from the Humanist Party. In 1989 she became the world's first Humanist to win a seat in parliament, after claiming victory as part of the Concertación coalition.

Rodríguez was born in Santiago, Chile. She married Darío Ergas in 1978. She was active in and eventually became president of the Community for Human Development. She graduated as engineer from the University of Chile in 1983.

Rodríguez was co-founder of the Humanist Party in 1984 and was president of the party in 1990. She was elected to the Chilean parliament in 1989 for the La Reina-Peñalolén electoral district.

Rodríguez died of brain cancer in 1992.

External links
Laura Rodríguez Foundation (in Spanish)

1957 births
1992 deaths
Chilean people of Italian descent
Members of the Chamber of Deputies of Chile
Chilean democracy activists
University of Chile alumni
Chilean humanists
People from Santiago
Humanist Party (Chile) politicians
Candidates for President of Chile
Deaths from cancer in Chile
Deaths from brain tumor
20th-century Chilean women politicians
20th-century Chilean politicians
Women members of the Chamber of Deputies of Chile